Paria frosti is a species of leaf beetle. It is found in North America. It is named after C. A. Frost, who collected the specimens the species was described from.

References

Further reading

 

Eumolpinae
Articles created by Qbugbot
Beetles described in 1957
Beetles of the United States